Stephen Charles Jones is a British session bass player, songwriter, record producer, and Grammy Award winner.

Career
Jones's career as a recording and touring artist has spanned well over three decades. In the passing of time, he worked with Robert Plant, Page and Plant, Loreena McKennitt, Goldfrapp, Siouxsie Sioux, and others. He plays both electric and double bass.

Jones received a Grammy Award in 2009 as a co-writer of the song "Please Read the Letter" from the album Raising Sand by Robert Plant and Alison Krauss, originally recorded by Page and Plant for the album Walking into Clarksdale.

On 16 September 2013, Jones released his debut solo album Love Form through Stranger Records which highlighted his jazz and classical influences.

Whilst Jones has largely been associated with playing an acrylic bass, in 2022 Fender Custom Shop built him a plastic precision bass. This work was undertaken by Master Builder Scott Buehl.

Recording Credits

Touring Credits

References

External links

Living people
Musicians from Bristol
English rock bass guitarists
English male guitarists
Male bass guitarists
English session musicians
1965 births